The Nelson station (located in Nelson, British Columbia, Canada) and was built by the Canadian Pacific Railway in 1900.  The 2-story, wood-frame, railway station is located near the lakefront to serve as an important meeting point between rail and steamboat transportation. This station is no longer used as a passenger station and the building has been designated a national heritage railway station. It is now home to the Nelson Chamber of Commerce, a coffee shop on the East end of the building, with the remainder still undergoing restoration. The station was also used by Great Northern Railway's Nelson and Fort Sheppard Railway.

References 

Designated Heritage Railway Stations in British Columbia
Railway stations in Canada opened in 1900
Disused railway stations in Canada
Canadian Pacific Railway stations in British Columbia
1900 establishments in British Columbia
Nelson, British Columbia
Former Great Northern Railway (U.S.) stations